Bisweshwar Tudu  is an Indian politician from Odisha who currently serving as the Union Minister of State for Tribal Affairs and Jal Shakti, Government of India from 7 July 2021. He is a member of the Bharatiya Janata Party. He is also a Member of Parliament from Mayurbhanj and National Secretary of BJP.

References

External links
 Official biographical sketch in Parliament of India website

India MPs 2019–present
Lok Sabha members from Odisha
Living people
Bharatiya Janata Party politicians from Odisha
Santali people
1965 births
People from Mayurbhanj district